Titiopolis or Titioupolis was a town of ancient Cilicia and later in the Roman province of Isauria.

Name and location 

Some refer to the town by the name Titopolis, but a coin minted there in the time of Emperor Hadrian bears on the reverse the word ΤΙΤΙΟΠΟΛΙΤΩΝ (Of the inhabitants of Titiopolis). Other sources cited in the presentation about that coin to the Royal Numismatic Society give the same form. These concern the names of bishops of Titiopolis (considered below) and also the information given by the Hieroclis Synecdemus, by George of Cyprus, and by Constantine Porphyrogenitus, according to which Titiopolis was one of the cities of the Isaurian Decapolis. The editors of the Barrington Atlas of the Greek and Roman World conjecture that the old Isaurian bishopric (and, now, titular see) of Cardabunta or Kardabounda may be identified with the town.

The ruins of Titiopolis lie about 4 kilometres north-north-west of Anamur.

Ecclesiastical History

Bishopric 
Titiopolis was also the seat of an ancient Bishopric.

Le Quien mentions three bishops of Titiopolis: 
Artemius at the Council of Constantinople in 381; 
Mompraeus at the Council of Chalcedon in 451; 
Domitius at the Trullan Council in 692. 

The see of Titiopolis is mentioned in the 6th century Notitia episcopatuum of Antioch and, after Isauria was annexed to the Patriarchate of Constantinople in about 732, in the Notitia episcopatuum of that church and in that of Leo the Wise in about 900 and that of Constantine Porphyrogenitus in about 940.

The last mention of Titiopolis as a residential see is by William of Tyre in the late 12th century. He speaks of it as one of the 24 suffragan sees of Seleucia in Isauria.

The see of Titiopolis is now included in the Catholic Church's list of titular sees.

Titular Bishops
 •Jean de Karlestadt, O.S.A. † ( 1389 Appointed - ) 
 •Luís da Silva Teles, O.SS.T. † (1 Jul 1671 Appointed - 8 Mar 1677 Appointed, Bishop of Lamego) 
 •Bl. Niels Stensen † (13 Sep 1677 Appointed - 5 Dec 1686 Died) 
 •Marco Gradenigo † (22 Aug 1699 Appointed - 19 Nov 1714 Appointed, Bishop of Verona) 
 •Charles-Marin Labbé, M.E.P. † (12 Sep 1703 Appointed - 24 Mar 1723 Died) 
 •Angel Benito, O.S.B. † (4 Mar 1720 Appointed - ) 
 •Gabriel Zerdahely † (11 Dec 1780 Appointed - 22 Dec 1800 Confirmed, Bishop of Banská Bystrica) 
 •Ferenc Miklósy † (20 Jul 1801 Appointed - 20 Jun 1803 Confirmed, Bishop of Oradea Mare {Gran Varadino, Nagyvárad}) 
 •Vicente Alexandre de Tovar † (20 Jun 1803 Appointed - 8 Oct 1808 Died) 
 •Manuel del Villar † (4 Sep 1815 Appointed - 23 Sep 1816 Appointed, Bishop of Lérida) 
 •Nicolò Gatto † (21 Feb 1820 Appointed - 17 Nov 1823 Confirmed, Bishop of Patti) 
 •Giorgio Papas (Papasian) † (6 Dec 1826 Appointed - ) 
 •Francis Kelly † (3 Aug 1849 Appointed - 18 Jun 1864 Succeeded, Bishop of Derry) 
 •John Cameron † (11 Mar 1870 Appointed - 17 Jul 1877 Succeeded, Bishop of Arichat, Nova Scotia) 
 •Valentin Garnier, S.J. † (21 Jan 1879 Appointed - 14 Aug 1898 Died) 
 •Juan José Laguarda y Fenollera † (19 Jun 1899 Appointed - 9 Jun 1902 Appointed, Bishop of Urgell) 
 •Vilmos Batthyány † (3 Jan 1902 Appointed - 18 Mar 1911 Succeeded, Bishop of Nitra) 
 •Domenico Raffaele Francesco Marengo, O.P. † (8 Mar 1904 Appointed - 25 Jul 1904 Succeeded, Archbishop of Izmir (Smirne)) 
 •Edward Joseph Hanna † (22 Oct 1912 Appointed - 1 Jun 1915 Appointed, Archbishop of San Francisco) 
 •Pierre Verdier † (22 Mar 1917 Appointed - 21 May 1924 Died) 
 •Joseph Alfred Langlois † (14 Jul 1924 Appointed - 10 Jul 1926 Appointed, Bishop of Valleyfield, Québec) 
 •Pedro Francisco Luna Pachón, O.F.M. † (17 Jul 1926 Appointed - 15 Mar 1967 Died)

References

Former populated places in Turkey
Catholic titular sees in Asia
Populated places in ancient Cilicia
Populated places in ancient Isauria
Roman towns and cities in Turkey
Populated places of the Byzantine Empire